Shaolin's Finest is a compilation album by American rapper Ghostface Killah, featuring singles from the albums Ironman, Supreme Clientele, and Bulletproof Wallets. It was done to fulfill Ghostface's four-album contract with Epic Records.

Track listing

References

Ghostface Killah albums
2003 compilation albums